Rukaj is a village and a former municipality in the Dibër County, northern Albania. At the 2015 local government reform it became a subdivision of the municipality Mat. The population at the 2011 census was 2,507.

References

Former municipalities in Dibër County
Administrative units of Mat (municipality)
Villages in Dibër County